The Soccer Bowl was the annual championship game of the North American Soccer League, which ran from 1968 to 1984. The two top teams from the playoffs faced off in the final to determine the winner of the NASL Trophy. From the league's founding in 1968 through 1974, the championship game (or series, as it was played through 1971) was known as the NASL Championship Final, and in 1984 the single game was replaced by a best-of-three series known as the Soccer Bowl Series.

History
The NASL championships began as a three-game series.  In 1974, the league switched to a single-game championship hosted by the top-seeded club.

Then-NASL Commissioner Phil Woosnam wanted to build excitement for the championship game.  He envisioned a week-long, neutral-site championship event in the mold of the NFL's Super Bowl. On August 24, 1975 the first Soccer Bowl was played Spartan Stadium in San Jose, California, as the Tampa Bay Rowdies defeated the Portland Timbers.  Unlike the Super Bowl, the NASL's annual numbering scheme did not use Roman numerals (e.g., Super Bowl IX), but instead used the last two digits of the year played (e.g., Soccer Bowl '78). 

Under Woosnam's guidance, the Soccer Bowl became a major sporting event.  The biggest attendance was for Soccer Bowl '78, when 74,091 filled Giants Stadium in the New York metropolitan area, still the highest attendance to date for any club soccer championship in the United States.

The last Soccer Bowl returned to a best-of-three series format that took place in early October 1984, and the league ceased operation in 1985.

Format
The NASL used several different formats for its championship matches over the course of its history. 

The 1968 and 1970 NASL Finals were contested with a two-game series, one in each of the two teams' stadiums, and the winner decided by aggregate goals. 

The NASL contracted from 17 teams to 5 for the 1969 season, so no final was held. Instead, as in many leagues in Europe, the championship was awarded to the team with the most points at season's end.

The 1971 NASL Final was played in a best-of-three series, with games one and three hosted by the higher-seeded team.

After 1971, the NASL Championship Final switched to a single game. The 1972 through 1974 were hosted by the highest-seeded team.  In 1975, Woosnam's dream of a neutral-site event became reality, and the Soccer Bowl was born.  That format continued through the 1983 final.

For the league's final season in 1984, the finals reverted to a best-of-three series, although it retained the "Soccer Bowl" moniker, used alternately with "Soccer Bowl Series".

Legacy
A new minor league North American Soccer League began play in 2011, borrowing much of the iconography of the original. This second league used the name "Soccer Bowl" for their championship match in 2013, and then only for the championship trophy itself from 2014 through the end of the league in 2017.

Results
Sources: WildStat, NASL, Steve Dimitry, Soccer Times

Notes

See also
 North American Soccer League (2011–2017)
 United States soccer league system
 Canadian soccer league system
 North American Soccer League (1968–84)
 National Professional Soccer League (1967)
 United Soccer Association (1967)
 North American Soccer League (1968–84) on television
 Record attendances in United States club soccer
 Soccer Bowl (2011–2017)
 MLS Cup

References

External links
 Soccer Bowl on NASL (archived, 30 Sep 2013)

 
North American Soccer League
North American Soccer League (1968–1984)
National Professional Soccer League (1967)